Vladislav Mikhailovich Metyolkin (born 11 March 1962) is a contemporary Ukrainian landscape painter.

Biography 

Vladislav was born the fifth child in a large family and orphaned early. His mother died when he was just five, his father – when he was nine. Only the support of elder brothers helped get over the terrible loss.

In 1979 he undergoes a poster artist training and later manages to get a position of artist at Lugansk Regional Philharmonic.

In 1980 Vladislav was mobilized to Strategic Rocket Forces in the city Rostov-on-Don.

From 1983 to 1988 he studies at K. D. Ushynsky South Ukrainian National Pedagogical University at the Institute of Arts.

The artist is married and has a daughter.

Artistic career and exhibitions 

 1991 – Vladislav appointed as an art director of artist association "Creativity" in Odessa.
 1994 – His first solo exhibition takes place in the Odessa Museum of Regional History.
 1999 – Exhibition of artworks in National Academy of Internal Affairs of Ukraine (Kyiv).
 2000 – Participation in the art exhibitions "Kiev Spring-2000" (Kyiv); "Our Home – Odessa" (Odessa); art project "Spring" (Kyiv).
 2001 – Participation in the art exhibitions "Euroimage – 2001" (Kyiv); "Art Bridge Project" (Odessa); "Odessa Art Panorama" (Odessa); "MMM" – "Metyolkin-Melnikov-Mikhailov" (Odessa); "Fifth International Festival" (Odessa).
 2002 – Participation in the art exhibition "Poetry of colors" in Ukrainian Cultural Foundation (Kyiv).
 2006 – Vladislav presents his paintings to the collection of Zaporizhia Regional Art Museum.
 2007 – Participation in the art project "Blessing" (Russian House of Science and Culture in Berlin, Germany); art-festival "Blessing" (Germany, Magdeburg).
 2007 – Vladislav's solo exhibition takes place in the museum "Spiritual Treasures of Ukraine" (Kyiv).
 2007 – Solo exhibition "Poetry of Nature" is held in Taras Shevchenko National University of Kyiv, with the assistance of Yaroslav Mudry International Educational Foundation.

 2007 – Participation in the exhibition dedicated to the opening of International Foundation "Cultural Heritage", in the gallery "N-Prospect" (Russia, St. Petersburg)
 2008 – Participation in the International art exhibition "Montenegro" (Kotor); First International plein air "Montenegro 2008".
 2008 – Solo exhibition in the gallery "N-Prospect" (Russia m. St. Petersburg).
 2009 – Participation in the art exhibition "Dew" (Slovakia, Bratislava and Prague).
 2011 – Participation in the art exhibition "To Italy with Whole Heart" (Italy, Rome and Milan).
 2012 – Participation in the project "Aviart-2012".
 2013 – Participation in the art exhibition "Nature's gentle breath".
 2016 – Participation in the art exhibition "Heritage". Gallery "Heritage" (Switzerland, Geneve).
 2016 – Solo exhibition "My Ukraine", dedicated to the 25th anniversary of the artist's professional work, Gallery "Gamma", Kyiv.

Paintings by V.Metyolkin are purchased by several museums in Ukraine and Russia and are held in private collections in Ukraine, Russia, United States, France, Poland and Germany.

Awards and prizes 

 2004 – Patriarch Filaret personally rewards Vladislav Metyolkin with an Order of St. Michael the Archangel of III class – "Order of Merit for reviving spirituality in Ukraine and the establishment of the Local Ukrainian Orthodox Church".
 2007 – The first-degree Diploma from International Foundation "Cultural Heritage" "For the contribution to the development of Russian realistic art".
 2012 – The Gold Medal «For mastership» (a medal of the First degree) and Honorary Diploma from International Foundation "Cultural Heritage" – "For Major Contribution to the Art".

Literature 
 Art album of Vladislav Metyolkin.

Notes

External links 
 Personal Site of Vladislav Metyolkin
 Official Facebook Page
 Personal Profile on Facebook
 Vladislav Metyolkin on artboyko.com
 https://www.saatchiart.com/metyolkinart

1962 births
Living people
20th-century Ukrainian painters
20th-century Ukrainian male artists
21st-century Ukrainian painters
21st-century Ukrainian male artists
K. D. Ushinsky South Ukrainian National Pedagogical University alumni
Artists from Odesa
Ukrainian male painters